The 1978 New England Patriots season was the franchise's 9th season in the National Football League and 19th overall. They finished the season with a record of eleven wins and five losses, tied for first in the AFC East, and had the tiebreaker over the Miami Dolphins; it was the Patriots' second division title, and the first since 1963, the fourth year of the AFL.

A record which would not be broken until the Baltimore Ravens led by Lamar Jackson some four decades later. They had four players who rushed for more than 500 yards each: running back Sam "Bam" Cunningham, 768; running back Andy Johnson, 675; running back Horace Ivory, 693; and quarterback Steve Grogan, 539. The team also picked up an NFL-record 181 rushing first-downs.

Staff

Roster

Regular season 

Following a preseason hit in Oakland that paralyzed popular receiver Darryl Stingley for life, the Patriots staggered to a 1–2 start before upsetting the Oakland Raiders on the road. From there the Patriots stormed to win nine of their next 12 games, establishing an NFL record for rushing yards at 3,165. The Patriots clinched their first division title with a 26–24 win over the Buffalo Bills with one game remaining.

Schedule 

Note: Intra-division opponents are in bold text.

Standings

Post season

Schedule

Notable games

Preseason 
Tragedy blackened a 21–7 Patriots win over the Raiders when, late in the second quarter, Darryl Stingley jumped after a Steve Grogan throw and was crushed in the jaw by Jack Tatum of the Raiders. The hit paralyzed Stingley for life. The tragedy was also a turning point in Chuck Fairbanks' relationship with the Sullivan family; he was already upset over the previous season when the Sullivans overruled him over new contracts with John Hannah and Leon Gray, and with Stingley he had worked out an agreement on a contract extension before the team traveled to Oakland, but the Monday after the game, Stingley's attorney telephoned Chuck Sullivan about the contract and Sullivan said, "We don't have a contract with Stingley." Fairbanks, according to Hannah, "was livid. He decided right then that he wouldn't stay with an organization that treated its folks like that."

Week 3 

Hosting the Colts on Monday Night Football at a rain-soaked Schaefer Stadium the Patriots were downed 34–27 on a one-man scoring rampage by the Colts' Joe Washington, who threw a 54-yard touchdown to Roger Carr, caught a 23-yard score from Bill Troup, and after a game-tying Sam Cunningham touchdown run in the fourth returned the ensuing kick 90 yards for the game-winning touchdown.

Week 4 

    
    
    
    
    

Returning to Oakland nearly six weeks after Darryl Stingley's near-fatal injury, the Patriots rallied from a 14–0 second-quarter gap by forcing three Ken Stabler interceptions and scoring 21 unanswered points by Russ Francis, Horace Ivory, and Sam Cunningham. The team visited Stingley in the Oakland-area hospital where he was still staying and his jovial banter with the team warmed their spirits enormously.

Week 9 
In a bizarre harbinger of Spygate, the Patriots exploded for eight touchdowns – Steve Grogan threw to Harold Jackson twice (David Posey missed the PAT on Jackson's second score), Stanley Morgan, and Russ Francis, and two rushing scores apiece by Horace Ivory and James McAlister – in a 55–21 slaughter of the Jets. Jets coach Walt Michaels suspected the Patriots were deciphering his coaching staff's codes and that a rival team had tipped off the Patriots to these codes – "This will never happen to us again", Michaels stewed afterward. "I know what they did, but by the time we figured it out, it was too late."

Week 10 
TV Network: NBC 
Announcers: Sam Nover and Len Dawson
New England, using a double tight end offense to control the ball in the second half, got past Buffalo on the running of Horace Ivory, who carried the ball 16 times for 128 yards and two touchdowns. His 19-yard touchdown run in the second period and his 5-yard touchdown run in the third period. The Bills try to come back late in the game after they recovered a Patriots fumble and took advantage as Joe Ferguson hooked up with Bob Chandler for a 11-yard touchdown connection. But a failed onsides kick gave the Ball to the Patriots who ran out the clock to secure them a 7th straight victory for the Pats.

Week 11 
The Patriots' seven-game winning streak crashed to a halt as they stormed to a 23–0 lead in the second quarter but surrendered four unanswered Houston touchdowns (marred by two missed PATs by Toni Fritsch) and a 26–23 Houston win.

Week 13 
The Patriots crushed the Colts 35–14, sacking Bill Troup eight times while snatching two Troup interceptions (Mike Haynes scored from Baltimore's 36-yard line with the first INT) for good measure. Harold Jackson, Andy Johnson, and Sam Cunningham rushed in touchdowns while Stanley Morgan caught a 75-yard touchdown strike from Steve Grogan.

Week 15 
Playing in a snowstorm, the Patriots needed a win to clinch the AFC East. They trailed for most of this game as Roland Hooks and Terry Miller of the Bills scored on the ground and Frank Lewis caught a 21-yard touchdown from Joe Ferguson. The Patriots also suffered when linebackers Steve Zabel and Steve Nelson were injured. They rallied, however, behind rushing scores by Sam Cunningham, Steve Grogan, and Horace Ivory and a safety when Tim Fox ran Bills punter Rusty Jackson out of the endzone; Bills coach Chuck Knox allowed a safety because he feared punting out of his team's endzone. In the game's final eight seconds the Bills led 24–23 but David Posey kicked the winning field goal from 21 yards out, clinching a 26–24 win.

Week 16 
The celebration of the AFC East title was wiped out when coach Chuck Fairbanks, who'd been negotiating a head coaching position with the University of Colorado all season, was suspended just before New England's regular-season wrapup in Miami on Monday Night Football. Coordinators Hank Bullough and Ron Erhardt took over as co-head coaches for the game. The suspension of Fairbanks and elevation of Bullough and Erhardt took the team, radioman Gil Santos, and the ABC Network's Howard Cosell by surprise. The Patriots were crushed 23–3 by the Dolphins; Steve Grogan injured his knee during the game. Despite the loss the Patriots won the division on tie-breakers over the 11–5 Dolphins and secured a playoff bye.

Divisional 
To the surprise of everyone, Chuck Fairbanks was reinstated as head coach for the playoffs, but by then he had lost the respect of the locker room, and in their very first home playoff game the Patriots were massacred by the Oilers 31–14 behind three Dan Pastorini touchdown throws and an Earl Campbell rushing score. Steve Grogan, unable to push off on his injured knee, threw two interceptions and was knocked out of the game; backup Tom Owen managed one touchdown (a 24-yard strike to Russ Francis) while Harold Jackson caught a 24-yard score from Andy Johnson. Following the game Fairbanks left for good amid long-running acrimony with Billy and Chuck Sullivan; a lawsuit was settled on April 2, 1979, that gave the Patriots $200,000 and made Fairbanks liable if he took another NFL job before 1983, the period when his previous contract was supposed to end.

References

See also 
 New England Patriots seasons

New England Patriots
New England Patriots seasons
AFC East championship seasons
New England Patriots
Sports competitions in Foxborough, Massachusetts